Claude Sammut is a professor of computer science and engineering at the University of New South Wales and Head of the Artificial Intelligence Research Group. He was the UNSW node Director of the ARC Centre of Excellence for Autonomous Systems (CAS), a program manager for the Smart Internet Technology CRC and a member of the joint ARC/NH&MRC project on Thinking Systems.

Early work
His early work on relational learning helped to the lay the foundations for the field of inductive logic programming (ILP). With Donald Michie, he also did pioneering work in behavioural cloning.

Current research
His current interests include conversational agents and robotics. He was the leader of the UNSW teams that won RoboCup four-legged robot competitions in 2000, 2001 and 2003 and the CAS team that won the award for best autonomous robot at RoboCup Rescue 2009.

Claude Sammut is a member of the editorial boards of the Journal of Machine Learning Research, the Machine Learning journal and New Generation Computing. He was the program and general chair of the 2002 International Conference on Machine Learning and the general chair of ICML 2007. He was a member of the executive committee of the RoboCup Federation from 2003 to 2009 and was the co-editor-in-chief of Springer's Encyclopedia of Machine Learning in 2010.

Research interests
Machine learning
Robotics
User interfaces
Software
Applications

RoboCup
Professor Sammut has been involved in RoboCup since 1999 when UNSW first entered in the Sony 4-Legged League. He has been in charge of teams in the 4-Legged League, Simulation, Rescue, and the Standard Platform League since then. He was appointed as a Trustee of RoboCup in 2012. In 2021 he was the chair elect of the RoboCup federation.

References

External links
 Publications

Living people
Australian computer scientists
Academic staff of the University of New South Wales
Year of birth missing (living people)